The 1908 Montrose Burghs by-election was held on 12 May 1908.  The by-election was held due to the elevation to the peerage of the incumbent Liberal MP, John Morley.  It was won by the Liberal candidate Robert Harcourt.

References

Montrose Burghs by-election
1900s elections in Scotland
Politics of Angus, Scotland
Montrose Burghs by-election
Montrose Burghs by-election
By-elections to the Parliament of the United Kingdom in Scottish constituencies